Sadatabad-e Lishtar (also Romanized as Sādātābād-e Līshtar; also known as Sādāt) is a village in Lishtar Rural District, in the Central District of Gachsaran County, Kohgiluyeh and Boyer-Ahmad Province, Iran. At the 2006 census, its population was 116, in 25 families.

References 

Populated places in Gachsaran County